The British Academy Television Craft Award for Best Director: Factual is one of the categories presented by the British Academy of Film and Television Arts (BAFTA) within the British Academy Television Craft Awards, the craft awards were established in 2000 with their own, separate ceremony as a way to spotlight technical achievements, without being overshadowed by the main production categories.

In 2006 and 2007 there was only on category for directors but in 2008 the category was split in three separate categories to recognize directing for different programming, first creating Best Director: Factual and Best Director: Fiction and then in 2011 Best Director: Multi-Camera.

Winners and nominees

2000s
Best Director

Best Director: Factual

2010s

2020s

See also
 Primetime Emmy Award for Outstanding Directing for a Documentary/Nonfiction Program

References

External links
 

Director: Factual